The Västmanland Regiment, designations I 18 and Fo 48, was a Swedish Army infantry regiment that traced its origins back to the 16th century. It was disbanded for the first time in 1927 but later reraised and disbanded again in 1997. The regiment's soldiers were originally recruited from the province of Västmanland, and it was later garrisoned there.

History 
The regiment has its origins in fänikor (companies) raised in Västmanland in the 1550s and 1560s. In 1617, these units—along with fänikor from the nearby provinces of Dalarna and Uppland—were organised by Gustav II Adolf into Upplands storregemente, of which six of the total 24 companies were recruited in Västmanland. Upplands storregemente consisted of three field regiments, of which Västmanland Regiment was one. Sometime around 1623, the grand regiment was permanently split into three smaller regiments, of which Västmanland Regiment was one.

The regiment was officially raised in 1628 although it had existed since 1623. Västmanland Regiment was one of the original 20 Swedish infantry regiments mentioned in the Swedish constitution of 1634. The regiment's first commander was Bengt Bagge. It was allotted in 1682 as one of the first regiments to be so.

The regiment was given the designation I 18 (18th Infantry Regiment) in a general order in 1816. Västmanland Regiment was garrisoned in Västerås from 1906. The regiment was disbanded in 1927, but was reorganised in 1994 as a local defence district with the designation Fo 48, although disbanded again just three years later in 1997.

Campaigns 
The Polish War (1600–1629)
The Thirty Years' War (1630–1648)
The Northern Wars (1655–1661)
The Scanian War (1674–1679)
The Great Northern War (1700–1721)
The Hats' Russian War (1741–1743)
The Seven Years' War (1757–1762)
The Gustav III's Russian War (1788–1790)
The Finnish War (1808–1809)
The War of the Sixth Coalition (1813–1814)

Organisation 

1634(?)
Livkompaniet
Överstelöjtnantens kompani
Majorens kompani
Bergslags kompani
Strömsholms kompani
Väsby kompani
Salbergs kompani
Kungsörs kompani

1814(?)
Livkompaniet
Folkare kompani
Väsby kompani
Salbergs kompani
Västerås kompani
Strömsholms kompani
Bergs kompani
Kungsörs kompani

Heraldry and traditions

Colours, standards and guidons
The regiment was presented with its last colours (two battalion colours) in 1859 (m/1859), which it received at Ladugardsgärdet in Stockholm. It was used until the regiment was disbanded in 1927. The colour came after a government decision to be used by the Västmanland Wing (F 1). Västmanland Wing took over the colour on 26 September 1943, which also included the regimental battle honours, and it then became Sweden's only air force wing with battle honours on its colour. The colour was used until Västmanland Wing was disbanded in 1983.

The new regiment which was raised on 1 July 1994, sought its traditions Västmandland Regiment which was disbanded in 1927. However, the regiment did not inherit the 1859 colour, but received a new colour. The colour was presented to the Västmanland Regiment (Fo 48) in Västerås by the Chief of the Army, lieutenant general Åke Sagrén in 1994. It was used as regimental colour by Fo 48 until 1 September 1997. The colour was drawn by Ingrid Lamby and embroidered by machine in insertion technique by Gunilla Hjort. Blazon: "On white cloth the provincial badge of Västmanland; a threepointed blue mountain, flamed proper. On a blue border at the upper side of the colour, battle honours (Narva 1700, Düna 1701, Kliszów 1702, Fraustadt 1706, Helsingborg 1710, Gadebusch 1712, Valkeala 1790) in white."

Coat of arms
The coat of the arms of the Västmanland Regiment (Fo 48) 1994–1997 and the Västmanland Group 1997–2004. Blazon: "Argent, the provincial badge of Västmanland, a three-pointed mountain azure, flammant proper. The shield surmounted two muskets in saltire or".

Medals

Heritage
After the regiment was disbanded in 1997, the regimental traditions was passed on to the Västmanland Group. From 1 July 2013, the traditions are continued by the Västmanland Battalion within the Uppland and Västmanland Group.

Other
The regimental march was "Prinz Friedrich Carl-March". After the regiment was disbanded, the march was taken over by the Västmanland Wing. However, it came to be titled "". When the new regiment was raised in 1994, the march regained its original title.

Commanding officers

Regimental commander active from 1628 to 1997.

1628–16??: Bengt Bagge
1631–1634: Erik Lilliehöök af Fårdala
1634–19??: Erik Stenbock
1656–1658: William Philp
1667–1668: Erik Leijonhielm
1668–1677: Thomas van der Noot
1678–1693: Peter Creimers
1699–1716: Axel Sparre
1710–1710: Gustaf Johan Tunderfelt (acting)
1712–1713: Melker Falkenberg (acting)
1714–1716: Carl Breitholtz
1716–1720: Bernhard Reinhold von Delwig (acting)
1720–1728: Axel Sparre
1728–1739: Gustaf Fredrik von Rosen
1739–1747: Otto Christian von der Pahlen
1747–1770: Samuel Gustaf Stierneld
1770–1771: Gustaf Adolf von Siegroth
1771–1773: Jonas Cronstedt
1773–1780: Fredrik Arvidsson Posse
1773–1780: Frederick Adolf (acting)
1780–1803: Frederick Adolf
1780–1785: Wilhelm Mauritz Pauli (Executive officer)
1788–1790: Jakob Gripensvärd, sekundchef
1790–1803: Lars Stiernstam, sekundchef
1804–1804: Lars Stiernstam
1804–1809: Adolf Ludvig von Friesendorff
1810–1815: Pehr Brändström
1816–1820: Carl Albrekt Leijonflycht
1820–1823: Fredrik Ludvig Ridderstolpe
1823–1825: Gustaf Abraham Peyron
1825–1834: Carl Joakim von Düben
1835–1836: Otto Palmstierna
1836–1836: Carl Fredrik Wilhelm von Tuné (acting)
1836–1844: Axel Johan Adam Möllerhjelm
1844–1851: Carl Fredrik Wilhelm von Tuné
1851–1860: Fredrik af Klercker
1860–1870: Johan Gabriel Eketrä
1870–1884: David August Leonard Silverstolpe
1884–1897: Axel Magnus Otto Reuterskiöld
1897–1902: Waldemar Anshelm Gotthard Nisbeth
1902–1906: Carl Conrad Vogel
1906–1914: Pehr Hasselrot
1915–1919: Joachim Åkerman
1919–1923: Magnus Adlercreutz
1923–1927: Axel Klingenstierna
1994–1995: Kjell Högberg
1995–1997: Göran Andersson

Names, designations and locations

See also
List of Swedish infantry regiments

Footnotes

References

Notes

Print

Further reading

Infantry regiments of the Swedish Army
Disbanded units and formations of Sweden
Military units and formations established in 1628
Military units and formations disestablished in 1709
Military units and formations established in 1709
Military units and formations disestablished in 1713
Military units and formations established in 1713
Military units and formations disestablished in 1927
Military units and formations established in 1994
Military units and formations disestablished in 1997